Embakasi East is a constituency in Kenya. Embakasi East includes five electoral wards: Upper Savannah, Lower Savannah, Embakasi, Utawala, Mihango.

References 

Constituencies in Nairobi